This is a list of King George V Playing Fields in Norfolk, England.

Norfolk
King G
King G
Lists of buildings and structures in Norfolk